The 2012–13 Rider Broncs men's basketball team represented Rider University during the 2012–13 NCAA Division I men's basketball season. The Broncs, led by first year head coach Kevin Baggett, played their home games at Alumni Gymnasium and were members of the Metro Atlantic Athletic Conference. They finished the season 19–15, 12–6 in MAAC play to finish in a tie for second place. They lost in the quarterfinals of the MAAC tournament to Fairfield. They were invited to the 2013 CIT where they defeated Hartford in the first round before losing in the second round to East Carolina.

Roster

Schedule

|-
!colspan=9| Exhibition

|-
!colspan=9| Regular season

|-
!colspan=9| 2013 MAAC men's basketball tournament

|-
!colspan=9| 2013 CIT

References

Rider Broncs men's basketball seasons
Rider
Rider
Rider Broncs
Rider Broncs